Tijana Jurić (4 May 1999 – 26 July 2014) was a 15 year old Serbian girl from Subotica, who was kidnapped and murdered in the night between the 25 and 26 of July 2014, near the Village Bajmok. She was seen for the last time 25 minutes after midnight, near the sports-center "Rata" in Bajmoka, while her body was found 12 days later, on August 7, on a neglected dump in Čonoplja in the municipality of Sombor. Dragan Đurić has been found guilty for murder and sentenced to 40 years in prison.

Disappearance 
Tijana disappeared in the night between 25 and 26 of July 2014, near the village of [Bajmok] in Vojvodina. The fifteen-year-old returned from the sea that day, on Friday, 25 July, at around 4 pm (16.00), where she was together with the company [specifically in Buljarica, organized by the school. The same evening she went by train to Bajmok, to meet her friends after the sea  She was wearing a white T-shirt, bright jeans and white "old women". Her grandmother and grandfather live on her mother's side in Bajmok.

Arriving in the village from her native Subotica, she called her mother. She went to the "Stevan Vitković Riba" indoor soccer tournament, which is held once a year in the Bajmoc hamlet of Rata. She spent the whole evening with friends. Around midnight, she went home, in the company of a girl and a boy. In the middle of the road, she decided to head back to Rata, to return the sweatshirt she had borrowed the other night (even though she had her sweater), and Jurić went back to the Sports Center "Rata".

According to the reconstruction presented by her father Igor Jurić, Tijana, returning alone on the same road, walked down JNA Street. On the corner of Tri istarske žrtve and Njegoševa streets, she met her friends about half an hour after midnight (00.25). When asked where she was going, she replied that she was going to return the borrowed sweatshirt. She continued down the street Tri istarske žrtve, crossed the railway and took the dirt road that leads to the sports field where a friend was waiting for her, whose sweatshirt she had borrowed. As she did not come for a long time, a friend from the field went to meet her. Tijana, however, was not there, and on the dirt road, about a hundred meters away, there was her white sneaker of the "Converse" brand (popularly "old woman"). 

It has been estimated that a maximum of seven minutes elapsed between the time she was last seen and the time her sneaker was found. She enrolled in music high school, majoring in cello and ethnomusicology. At the entrance exam, necessary for enrollment in this type of high school, she achieved the maximum number of points. She attended elementary music school for ten years, during which she won six awards at international and national competitions in this field.

See also 
List of kidnappings
List of solved missing person cases

References 

2010s missing person cases
2014 murders in Serbia
2014 murders in Europe
Incidents of violence against girls
July 2014 crimes in Europe
July 2014 events in Europe
Kidnapped children
Murdered Serbian children